Wilson-Tuscarora State Park is a  state park in Niagara County, New York. The park is located on the west side of the Village of Wilson along the south shore of Lake Ontario. Lake Road (New York State Route 18) passes through the park.

History
The park was formed in 1965 on what was previously a sheep farm.

Facilities
The park is open year-round for day use and offers a beach, picnic tables and pavilions, a playground, fishing (pan fish and game fish), hiking, a nature trail, seasonal wildfowl and small game hunting, snowshoeing and cross-county skiing, and a food concession. A marina launch from the park is located south of Sunset Island. There is also an 18-hole disc golf course at the park.

See also
 List of New York state parks

References

External links
 New York State Parks: Wilson-Tuscarora State Park
  Wildernet: Wilson-Tuscarora State Park

State parks of New York (state)
Parks in Niagara County, New York
1965 establishments in New York (state)
Protected areas established in 1965